Computo is a supervillain in the DC Comics universe and a foe of the Legion of Super-Heroes. It first appeared in Adventure Comics #340 (January 1966), in a story written by Jerry Siegel and illustrated by Curt Swan.

Fictional character biography

Pre-Crisis
Computo was created by Brainiac 5 to be a mechanical assistant, but instead became homicidal, and attempted an uprising of machines. It creates an army of replicas and begins terrorizing the city. Calculating that a confrontation with the Legion is imminent, it redesigns itself into its ultimate form, Computo the Conqueror, and send a distress signal which will recall all Legionnaires back to Earth. When the Legion returns unaware, Computo uses its database to create a weapon which neutralizes Legion members' powers and use it against them, and turns the Clubhouse into a walking automaton. Computo forces the Legion to leave Metropolis and kills one of Triplicate Girl's bodies, resulting in her becoming Duo Damsel. Brainiac 5 is finally able to defeat Computo by using an anti-matter device discovered in the ruins of the Batcave.  

Years later, after Brainiac 5 uses elements of its original circuitry, Computo re-emerges by possessing the mind of young Danielle Foccart. Computo is defeated when her brother Jacques uses the invisible formula invented by deceased Legionnaire Lyle Norg to become the second Invisible Kid. Several months later, Brainiac 5 would succeed in removing Computo from the young girl and place it within a matrix which tames the program and it becomes the Legion's majordomo--after first exploding the Legion HQ and then rebuilding and redesigning the structure in minutes. 

Years later, an army of Computo replicas would try to conquer Bismoll, but are defeated by Senator Tenzil Kem and the Legion of Substitute Heroes. This fiasco, although successful, drives Polar Boy to disband the group and apply for membership in the regular Legion. Sometime later, after resigning from the Legion, Brainiac 5 constructs an organic body (which resembles a dwarfish version of Validus) to house Computo and help the Legion cope with his absence. 

Following the events of the "Five Year Gap", the Dominators secretly seize the lifeform and use it as a basis for their enforcer B.I.O.N.

Post-Zero Hour
Following the Zero Hour reboot of Legion continuity, C.O.M.P.U.T.O. (Cybercerebral Overlapping Multi-Processor Universal Transceiver Operator) is created by Brainiac 5 when he and other Legionnaires are trapped in the 20th century and attempt to find a way to return to the 30th century. C.O.M.P.U.T.O is formed by the melding of three miniature supercomputers: a 30th-century Omnicom communications device; a Mother Box; and the "responsometer" (personality module) of Veridium of the Metal Men. C.O.M.P.U.T.O creates a portal to the 30th century, but turns against Brainiac when he assures the other Metal Men that Veridium's responsometer will be restored once C.O.M.P.U.T.O has served his purpose. C.O.M.P.U.T.O is seemingly destroyed, but returns in the 31st century as Presidential Advisor "Mister Venge", seemingly serving the wishes of a returned Ra's al Ghul's agenda. After al Ghul's defeat, he reveals himself as the leader of the computer nation of Robotica which threatens Earth.

Post-Infinite Crisis
In the Justice League of America/Justice Society of America crossover "The Lightning Saga", Sensor Girl replays the Legionnaires' first battle with Computo wherein one of Triplicate Girl's duplicates were killed.

The New 52
During The New 52]], Brainiac (although referred to only as 'The Colony of the Collector of Worlds') is first seen as the mysterious informant that supplies Lex Luthor information of Superman and his alien nature. Clark is having a dream of Krypton's final moments in which an artificial intelligence that controls the planet wakes up robots in an attempt to preserve the Kryptonian culture. Later, while Clark makes an interview in a robotic factory, suddenly the same harvester robots appear. At the same time John Corben, who is receiving his last adjustments in his transformation into Metallo, is suddenly possessed by the artificial intelligence who demands for Superman. The robots create havoc throughout Metropolis but Superman soon realizes that they are really after him. Superman fights the possessed Metallo with the help of John Henry Irons. Although they managed to defeat him, the alien sentience had already miniaturized and bottled the city of Metropolis and take it to his ship in space.

Notably, the ship into which Kal-El (who would be renamed Clark Kent when he was found on Earth) was placed as an infant was described as having "Brainiac AI", leaving the identity of the Collector of Worlds in doubt. The Colony of the Collector of Worlds told Superman that its AI technology went by different names, beginning on Yod-Colu as C.O.M.P.U.T.O. On Noma, he was called Pneumenoid; on Bryak it was Mind2; on Krypton he was called Brainiac 1.0; and, finally on Earth, he is the Internet.

In other media
 Computo appears in the animated series Legion of Super Heroes, voiced by Adam Wylie. This version never becomes evil, and is based in the Legion's Headquarters and later their ship, the Battle Cruiser.

References

External links
Computo at the Unofficial Guide to the DC Universe
C.O.M.P.U.T.O. at the Unofficial Guide to the DC Universe

DC Comics supervillains
DC Comics robots
Robot supervillains
Fictional artificial intelligences
Fictional characters with spirit possession or body swapping abilities
Comics characters introduced in 1966
Characters created by Jerry Siegel
Characters created by Curt Swan